This is a list of members of the 31st Legislative Assembly of Queensland from 1947 to 1950, as elected at the 1947 state election held on 3 May 1947.

During the term, the Queensland People's Party became the Queensland division of the Liberal Party of Australia.

 On 14 May 1949, the Labor member for Ipswich, David Gledson, died. Labor candidate Ivor Marsden won the resulting by-election on 10 September 1949.
 On 18 July 1949, the Labor member for Kurilpa, Kerry Copley, died. Labor candidate Tom Moores won the resulting by-election on 10 September 1949.
 On 27 October 1949, Ted Maher, the Country member for West Moreton resigned to contest a seat in the Australian Senate at the 1949 federal election. The following day, Charles Russell, the member for Dalby, resigned to contest the seat of Maranoa. No by-elections were held due to the proximity of the 1950 state election

See also
1947 Queensland state election
Hanlon Ministry (Labor) (1946–1952)

References

 Waterson, D.B. Biographical register of the Queensland Parliament, 1930-1980 Canberra: ANU Press (1982)
 

Members of Queensland parliaments by term
20th-century Australian politicians